DBNL can refer to 
Drebrin-like, a human gene.
Digital Library for Dutch Literature (Dutch: Digitale bibliotheek voor de Nederlandse letteren), abbreviated as dbnl, a website with the complete texts of a large number of Dutch books and other literature in Dutch language.